The Darlings of Rhythm was an African American, all-female swing band from the 1940s.

The Darlings were often compared with the International Sweethearts of Rhythm, another African American all-girl swing band. The Darlings were darker skinned than the Sweethearts. Toby Butler, a white member of the International Sweethearts of Rhythm, was rumored to have left the band and joined the Darlings in the mid-1940s, when racial segregation made playing in mixed bands illegal. This rumor was confirmed in 1946 when she was arrested while performing in Georgia.

Band members
Members of the Darlings changed over time, and included the following:

History
The Darlings were formed in 1943 in Harlem by African American tenor and baritone saxophonist Lorraine Brown.

Several of the band members joined the Darlings after leaving other bands. Cooper, Gaddison and Vi Wilson joined the Darlings after leaving the International Sweethearts of Rhythm. Wilson joined the group to be with her cousin, reeds player Gurthalee Clark. Trombonist Jessie Turner and tenor saxophonist Margaret Backstrom left Eddie Durham's All Star Girl Orchestra for the Darlings.

In 1945, drummer Hettie Smith replaced Henrietta Fontaine.

The bassist, drummer, and saxophonist for the Darlings later went to the Syncoettes band. Some members from the Darlings also went to Tiny Davis's Hell Divers.

See also
 Harlem Playgirls
 Ina Ray Hutton
 Melodears
 Prairie View Co-eds
 Eddie Durham's All-Star Girls Orchestra

References

Swing ensembles
Big bands
Musical groups established in 1943
History of racial segregation in the United States
All-female bands